"Legacy", also titled "Legacy (Save My Life)", is a song by Dutch producer and DJ Nicky Romero and American electronic dance music band Krewella. The song was initially released on July 15, 2013 through Protocol Recordings via Beatport, where it topped the website's Top 100 chart on the same week. It was later released worldwide as a digital download on September 9, 2013.

Music video
The music video premiered on YouTube on October 25, 2013. It was directed by Kyle Padilla and recorded late-August in Los Angeles.

Track listing
 Digital download

 The Remixes

Charts

Weekly charts

Year-end charts

Release history

References 

2013 singles
2013 songs
Nicky Romero songs
Krewella songs
Songs written by Nicky Romero
Ultra Music singles